Malaysia competed at the 1988 Summer Olympics in Seoul, South Korea. Nine competitors, five men and four women, took part in fifteen events in five sports.

Competitors
The following is the list of number of competitors in the Games.

Athletics

Men
Track event

Women
Track event

Cycling

Two male cyclists represented Malaysia in 1988.

Road

Track
Sprint

Time trial

Points race

Shooting

Mixed

Swimming

Men

Women

Table tennis

See also
 Malaysia at the 1986 Asian Games

References

 Official Olympic Reports

Nations at the 1988 Summer Olympics
1988
Summer Olympics